Cercospora coryli is a fungal plant pathogen.

References

coryli
Fungal plant pathogens and diseases